Shi Shanshan is a Chinese Paralympic powerlifter. She represented China at the 2008 Summer Paralympics, at the 2012 Summer Paralympics and at the 2016 Summer Paralympics and she won the bronze medal in the women's 48 kg event in 2012.

At the 2010 Asian Para Games held in Guangzhou, China, she won the gold medal in the women's 48 kg event. At the 2014 IPC Powerlifting World Championships she won the silver medal in the women's 55 kg event.

At the 2018 Asia-Oceania Open Powerlifting Championships, she won the silver medal in the women's 55 kg event.

References

External links 
 

Living people
Chinese powerlifters
Female powerlifters
Paralympic powerlifters of China
Paralympic bronze medalists for China
Paralympic medalists in powerlifting
Powerlifters at the 2008 Summer Paralympics
Powerlifters at the 2012 Summer Paralympics
Powerlifters at the 2016 Summer Paralympics
Medalists at the 2012 Summer Paralympics
Year of birth missing (living people)
Sportspeople from Handan
21st-century Chinese women